Makigumo  was a  of the Imperial Japanese Navy. Her name means "Cirrus Clouds" (Rolling Clouds).

Design and description
The Yūgumo class was a repeat of the preceding  with minor improvements that increased their anti-aircraft capabilities. Their crew numbered 228 officers and enlisted men. The ships had two Kampon geared steam turbines, each driving one propeller shaft, using steam provided by three Kampon water-tube boilers.

The main armament of the Yūgumo class consisted of six Type 3  guns in three twin-gun turrets, one superfiring pair aft and one turret forward of the superstructure. The guns were able to elevate up to 75° to increase their ability against aircraft, but their slow rate of fire, slow traversing speed, and the lack of any sort of high-angle fire-control system meant that they were virtually useless as anti-aircraft guns. They were built with four Type 96  anti-aircraft guns in two twin-gun mounts, but more of these guns were added over the course of the war. The ships were also armed with eight  torpedo tubes in a two quadruple traversing mounts; one reload was carried for each tube. Their anti-submarine weapons comprised two depth charge throwers for which 36 depth charges were carried.

Career
Following the Battle of Midway in June 1942, downed American aircrew SBD Ensign Frank W. O'Flaherty and AMM1c Bruno Gaido were pulled from the water by Makigumo.  After an interrogation, the crew tied weights around the feet of O'Flaherty and Gaido and threw them into the Pacific to drown, instead of keeping them prisoner until they reached Japan. Makigumos crew thought of it as payback for the loss in the battle of Midway of the aircraft carriers Akagi, Kaga, Sōryū, and Hiryū, which had formed two-thirds of the Kidō Butai Pearl Harbor attack force.

Shortly after the Battle of the Santa Cruz Islands during the early hours of 27 October 1942, Makigumo along with the destroyer  sank the heavily damaged and abandoned aircraft carrier . US destroyers had attempted to sink Hornet earlier but failed to do so before Japanese naval forces forced the US ships to withdraw. Despite this, the Japanese failed in their mission to bombard Henderson Field.

On 1 February 1943, Makigumo was on a troop evacuation run to Guadalcanal. While maneuvering to avoid a PT boat attack, she struck a mine.

References

Sources

External links
 CombinedFleet.com: Yūgumo-class destroyers
 CombinedFleet.com: Makigumo history

Yūgumo-class destroyers
World War II destroyers of Japan
Ships sunk by mines
Shipwrecks in the Solomon Sea
1941 ships
Maritime incidents in February 1943
Ships built by Fujinagata Shipyards